The National Archives of Andorra was established in 1975 under the direction of historian and civil servant Lídia Armengol i Vila.

The archival system of the Government of Andorra allows people to research letters, reports, notes, memos, photographs, and other primary sources. In the case of Andorra, it is a collection of cultural artifacts collected for and by Andorrans.

Typically, records there address the planning, control, use, conservation, and transfer or disposal of documentation with the aim of streamlining and unifying treatment and achieving effective and efficient management. The basic elements of the general system are the functional classification tables, inventories, evaluation tables and transfer sheets.

The Archives and Documents Management Area is attached to the Ministry of Culture and is the globalizing unit of archival practices. It represents the management of the entire Archives System of the Government of Andorra.

References

External links
The Department of Archives and Records Management (in Catalan)

Andorra
Museums in Andorra
Andorran culture
Museums established in 1975
1975 establishments in Andorra